National Highway 753BB, commonly referred to as NH 753BB is a national highway in India. It is a secondary route of National Highway 53.  NH-753BB runs in the state of Maharashtra in India.

Route 
NH753BB connects Nandurbar, Ghotane, Dondaicha, Bamne, Chillane, Kasbe, Shindkheda and Songir in the state of Maharashtra.

Junctions  
 
  Terminal near Nandurbar.
  near Dondaicha
  Terminal near Songir.

See also 
 List of National Highways in India
 List of National Highways in India by state

References

External links 

 NH 753BB on OpenStreetMap

National highways in India
National Highways in Maharashtra